Rhys John Howard Byrne (born 24 August 2002) is an English professional footballer who plays as a goalkeeper for Leyton Orient.

Playing career
Byrne signed a professional contract with Leyton Orient in the summer of 2021, following a season of training with the first team. He made his senior debut for Orient in the EFL Trophy at home to Southampton U21 on 14 September 2021, and subsequently played in three more matches in the tournament before Orient were knocked out by MK Dons in a penalty shoot-out. He kept clean sheets in all four appearances.

Statistics

References

External links
Rhys Byrne at Soccerbase

2002 births
Living people
English footballers
Footballers from the London Borough of Redbridge
Association football goalkeepers
Leyton Orient F.C. players
English Football League players